Koppal Assembly constituency is one of the 224 Legislative Assembly constituencies of Karnataka state in India.

It is part of Koppal district.

Members of the Legislative Assembly

Election results

2018

See also
 List of constituencies of the Karnataka Legislative Assembly
 Koppal district

References

Koppal district
Assembly constituencies of Karnataka